Port de la Bonaigua (el. 2072 m., 6,798 ft) is a mountain pass in the Pyrenees in Catalonia, Spain. It connects Esterri d'Àneu in the comarca of Pallars Sobirà with Vielha e Mijaran in the comarca of Aran.  The Baqueira-Beret ski resort is located at the top of the pass.

See also
 List of highest paved roads in Europe

External links
Port de la Bonaigua from Vielha - climbbybike.com
Port de la Bonaigua from Vielha e Mijaran - climbbybike.com

References

Mountain passes of Catalonia
Mountain passes of the Pyrenees
Val d'Aran
Pallars Sobirà